Sonia Cotten (born September 13, 1974) is a Canadian writer living in Quebec.

She was born in Rouyn-Noranda and studied human resource management, editorial practices and business communications at the Université du Québec à Montréal. Cotten was employed at the Maison de la culture Pointe-aux-Trembles and at the Cégep de l'Abitibi-Témiscamingue.

In 2002, she published her first poetry collection Changer le Bronx en or. She has also contributed to various poetry magazines. In 2015, she received the Prix Geneviève-Amyot for her poem Pour Jean-Paul Daoust.

Selected works 
 Nique à feu (2006)
 Mon chef c’est mon cœur (2009)
 Ovalta (2011)
 Marcher dans le ciel, children's book (2015)

References 

1974 births
Living people
Canadian women poets
Canadian poets in French
Université du Québec à Montréal alumni